Robert Eugene Marshak (October 11, 1916 – December 23, 1992) was an American physicist, educator, and eighth president of the City College of New York.

Biography
Marshak was born in the Bronx, New York City. His parents, Harry and Rose Marshak, were immigrants from Minsk. He went to the City College of New York for one semester and then "received a Pulitzer Scholarship which provided full tuition and a stipend which allowed him to continue his education at Columbia University."

In 1939, Marshak received his Ph.D. from Cornell University. Along with his thesis advisor, Hans Bethe, he discovered many of the fusion aspects involved in star formation. This helped him on his work for the Manhattan Project, in Los Alamos, during World War II. During this time, he developed an explanation of how shock waves work in extremely high temperatures achieved by a nuclear explosion, and these waves are known as Marshak waves.

Following the war, Marshak joined the University of Rochester Department of Physics, becoming head of the department in 1950.

In 1947, at the Shelter Island Conference, Marshak presented his two-meson hypothesis about the pi-meson, which were discovered shortly thereafter. Three years later, Marshak established the Rochester Conference while chair of the University of Rochester's physics department. This later became known as the International Conference on High Energy Physics.

In 1957, Marshak and George Sudarshan proposed a V-A ("vector" minus "axial vector") Lagrangian for weak interactions, which eventually paved the way for the electroweak theory. This theory was later presented by Richard Feynman and Murray Gell-Mann, which later contributed to each winning a Nobel Prize in Physics. Sudarshan stated that Gell-Mann had learned the theory from him at the Rochester Conference. Similarly, Richard Feynman learned about the theory from a discussion with Marshak in a conference. Feynman acknowledged Marshak and Sudarshan's contribution in 1963 stating that the V-A theory was discovered by Sudarshan and Marshak and publicized by Gell-Mann and himself.

Marshak was elected to the National Academy of Sciences in 1958, the American Academy of Arts and Sciences in 1961, and the American Philosophical Society in 1983.

In 1970, Marshak left Rochester to become president of the City College of New York. He left to become University Distinguished Professor at Virginia Tech, retiring in 1991.

Marshak shared the 1982 J. Robert Oppenheimer Memorial Prize with Maurice Goldhaber. The next year he served as the president of the American Physical Society, previously having served on its council (1965-1969), as chairman of its Division of Particles and Fields (1969-1970), and as vice-president.

Marshak died by accidental drowning in Cancún, Mexico. In addition to Sudarshan, his doctoral students include Susumu Okubo, Rabindra Mohapatra and Tullio Regge.

Selected works 

 Marshak, Robert E. (1952). Meson Physics. New York: McGraw-Hill. 
 Marshak, Robert E.; Radha, T.K.; Raman, K. (1963?) Theory of Weak Interactions of Elementary Particles. Matscience report no. 10. Madras: Institute of Mathematical Sciences. 
 Marshak, Robert E.; Blaker, J. Warren; Bethe, Hans A.; et al. (1966). Perspectivies in Modern Physics: Essays in Honor of Hans A. Bethe on the Occasion of His 60th Birthday, July 1966. New York: Interscience Publishers. 
 Marshak, Robert E.; Riazuddin; Ryan, Ciaran P. (1969). Theory of Weak Interactions in Particle Physics. New York: Wiley-Interscience. 
 Marshak, Robert E.; Wurtemburg, Gladys (1982). Academic Renewal in the 1970s : Memoirs of a City College President. Washington, D.C.: University Press of America.  
 Marshak, Robert E. (1993). Conceptual Foundations of Modern Particle Physics. Singapore: World Scientific.

Notes

Resources

 Henley, Ernest M.; Lustig, Harry (1999). Robert Eugene Marshak, 1916-1992. Washington, D.C.: National Academies Press. 
 Sudarshan, E.C.G.; et al. (1995). A Gift of Prophecy: Essays in Celebration of the Life of Robert Eugene Marshak. Singapore: World Scientific, 1995.

External links

 Robert E. Marshak Papers, Ms1988-060 at Virginia Tech Special Collections and University Archives
Robert Eugene Marshak Collection at the City College of New York
 Biographical Memoir at the National Academy of Sciences 
 
Robert Marshak Oral History Interviews from the American Institute of Physics

1916 births
1992 deaths
Cornell University alumni
Deaths by drowning
20th-century American physicists
Columbia College (New York) alumni
Presidents of City College of New York
Particle physicists
Members of the United States National Academy of Sciences
Accidental deaths in Mexico
American people of Belarusian-Jewish descent
Jewish American scientists
Scientists from New York (state)
Scientists from the Bronx
Manhattan Project people
Virginia Tech faculty
20th-century American Jews
Members of the American Philosophical Society
Members of the National Academy of Medicine
20th-century American academics
Presidents of the American Physical Society